Global information system is an information system which is developed and / or used in a global context. Some examples of GIS are SAP,  The Global Learning Objects Brokered Exchange and other systems.

Definition 
There are a variety of definitions and understandings of a global information system (GIS, GLIS), such as

 A global information system (GIS) is an information system which is developed and / or used in a global context.
 A global information system (GIS) is any information system which attempts to deliver the totality of measurable data worldwide within a defined context.

Common to this class of information systems is that the context is a global setting, either for its use or development process. This means that it highly relates to distributed systems / distributed computing where the distribution is global. The term also incorporates aspects of global software development and there outsourcing (when the outsourcing locations are globally distributed) and offshoring aspects. A specific aspect of global information systems is the case (domain) of global software development. A main research aspect in this field concerns the coordination of and collaboration between virtual teams. Further important aspects are the internationalization and language localization of system components.

Tasks in designing global information systems 
Critical tasks in designing global information systems are 
 Process and system design: How are the processes between distributed actors organized, how are the systems distributed / integrated.
 Technical architecture: What is the technical infrastructure enabling actors to collaborate?
 Support mechanisms: How are actors in the process of communication, collaboration, and cooperation supported?

A variety of examples can be given. Basically every multi-lingual website can be seen as a global information system. However, mostly the term GLIS is used to refer to a specific system developed or used in a global context.

Examples 
Specific examples are 
 Systems developed for multinational users, e.g., SAP as a global ERP system
 Global Information Systems for Education: The Global Learning Objects Brokered Exchange
 For the specific case of data integration : http://data.un.org, https://web.archive.org/web/20190825060649/http://www.internettrafficreport.com/, http://www.unhcr.org/statistics.html

More information / courses 
 Global Information Systems at the University of Jyväskylä
 Resources on Global Information Technology at AIS World

References 

Information
Information systems